Kislovodsk is a spa city in Stavropol Krai, Russia, in the North Caucasus region of Russia which is located between the Black and Caspian Seas. 

Population:

Etymology
The name of the city translates as "sour water" due to the abundance of mineral water (Narzan) that was referred to as such.

History
In 1803 Tsar Alexander I of Russia ordered the construction of the military station which became Kislovodsk. The site took its name from the many mineral springs around the city. The settlement gained town status in 1903.

In the late 19th and early 20th centuries, Kislovodsk as a fashionable spa attracted many musicians, artists, and members of the Russian aristocracy. Several of the events in Mikhail Lermontov's 1840 novel A Hero of Our Time take place in Kislovodsk.

Archaeology
Numerous ancient settlements of the Koban culture (ca. 1100 to 400 BC) are found in the Kislovodsk city and its surroundings. They include the sites of Industria I, Sultan-gora I, Berezovka I, Berezovka II, Berezovka III, Berezovka IV, etc.

Administrative and municipal status
Within the framework of administrative divisions, it is, together with seven rural localities, incorporated as the city of krai significance of Kislovodsk—an administrative unit with the status equal to that of the districts. As a municipal division, the city of krai significance of Kislovodsk is incorporated as Kislovodsk Urban Okrug.

Climate

Notable people
The most famous native of Kislovodsk was Nobel Prize winner Aleksandr Solzhenitsyn (1918-2008). A museum was planned in the house he was born. Renovations were to begin in 2011. Nikolai Yaroshenko's (1846-1898) memorial house is open to the public.

The notable Ukrainian historian Mykhailo Hrushevskyi (1866-1934) died when on exile to Kislovodsk under circumstances which remain mysterious and controversial.

Zuhra Bayramkulova, Hero of Soviet Labour, was born there.
Felix Feodosidi (born 1933), wine maker.
Boris Parsadanian, composer was born there.

Gallery

Twin towns and sister cities

Kislovodsk is twinned with:

  Aix-les-Bains, France
  Baguio, Philippines
  Batumi, Georgia
  Kiryat Yam, Israel
  Muscatine, Iowa, United States
  Nazran, Republic of Ingushetia, Russia
  Velingrad, Bulgaria

References

Notes

Sources

External links
 Official website of Kislovodsk 
 

1803 establishments in the Russian Empire
Cities and towns in Stavropol Krai
Koban culture
Populated places established in 1803
Spa towns in Russia
Terek Oblast